The Protocol for the Reconstruction of Austria was an agreement concluded on 4 October 1922 between the government of Austria and the governments of Great Britain, France, Italy and Czechoslovakia, providing for a gradual reconstruction of Austrian economy under League of Nations supervision. It was registered in League of Nations Treaty Series on the same day. The Spanish government acceded to the protocol on 3 November 1922.

Terms
The Protocol consisted of three declarations, all issued on the same date. In Declaration No. 1, the signatory parties undertook not to violate Austrian territorial or economic independence. Declaration No. 2 regulated the foreign loans to be granted to the Austrian government and established a Committee of Control to consist of the other signatory parties to overlook the allocations of funds during reconstruction. Declaration No. 3 granted the Austrian government the time required to arrange internal legislation to conform to Declaration No. 2 as well as the right to appeal certain decisions made by the Committee of Control.

Aftermath
The 1922 protocol was supplemented by the "Austrian Protocol" signed on 15 July 1932, under which the governments of Belgium, Britain, France, Italy and the Netherlands undertook to lend the Austrian government 300,000,000 Austrian Schillings for a period of 20 years.

See also
 Protocol for the reconstruction of Hungary

Sources 
 Text of the Protocol
 An article about the protocol
 Another explanation
 New York Times report about the conclusion of the Protocol

Further reading
 Marcus, Nathan. Austrian Reconstruction and the Collapse of Global Finance, 1921–1931 (Harvard University Press, 2018).
 Salter, Arthur. "The reconstruction of Austria." Foreign Affairs 2.4 (1924): 630-643. online

Notes

Aftermath of World War I in Austria
League of Nations treaties
Treaties of the First Austrian Republic
Treaties concluded in 1922
Treaties of the French Third Republic
Treaties of the United Kingdom (1801–1922)
Treaties of the Kingdom of Italy (1861–1946)
Treaties of Czechoslovakia
Interwar-period treaties
1922 in Switzerland
1922 in Austria